The Palermo tramway network is part of the public transport network of Palermo, Italy. It consists of four operational light rail lines; three more lines were under planning as of 2015

Service launched on 30 December 2015.

The current network operator is AMAT.

See also 
 List of town tramway systems in Italy
 History of rail transport in Italy
 Rail transport in Italy
 List of tram and light rail transit systems

References

External links 

 

Transport in Palermo
Palermo
1887 establishments in Italy
Palermo
Railway lines in Sicily
2015 establishments in Italy